Ada Brand Thomson (22 July 1929 – 3 October 1982), known professionally as Vivien Merchant, was an English actress. She began her career in 1942, and became known for dramatic roles on stage and in films. In 1956 she married the playwright Harold Pinter and performed in many of his plays.

Merchant achieved considerable success from the 1950s to the 1970s, winning the BAFTA TV Award for Best Actress in 1964. For her role in the film Alfie (1966), she received an Academy Award nomination for Best Supporting Actress, and won the BAFTA Award for Most Promising Newcomer. In 1967, she starred in the Broadway production of Pinter's The Homecoming, and received a Tony Award nomination. Her other films included Accident (1967), The Offence (1972), Frenzy (1972), The Homecoming (1973), and The Maids (1975). Suffering from depression and alcoholism as her marriage ended, she died in 1982, two years after her divorce.

Career
Merchant took her stage name as a composite of the actress Vivien Leigh and her brother, who was a merchant seaman (cited by Michael Billington). She began acting professionally in 1942, with supporting juvenile roles in repertory, progressing to West End roles in such works as Noël Coward's Sigh No More and Ace of Clubs, becoming an established lead in repertory in the early 1950s. Merchant subsequently performed in many stage productions and several films, including Alfie (1966), Accident (1967), Frenzy (1972), and The Offence (also 1972). Her performance in Alfie gained her Academy Award and Golden Globe nominations for Best Supporting Actress, and won her the BAFTA Award for Most Promising Newcomer and the National Board of Review Award for Best Supporting Actress.

After Merchant married the playwright Harold Pinter in 1956, she appeared in many of his plays, including the 1960 revival of his first play, The Room at the Hampstead Theatre, A Slight Ache, A Night Out, The Collection, and The Lover; the last was also a celebrated television production partnering Alan Badel at Associated Rediffusion, for which she was given an Evening Standard Theatre Award for Best Newcomer and the BAFTA Award for Best Actress, both in 1963.

Merchant subsequently appeared as Wendy in Tea Party opposite Leo McKern in 1965. She starred as Ruth in The Homecoming (1964) on stage in both London in 1965 and New York in 1967, receiving a Tony Award nomination for Best Actress in a Play. She went on to star in the film version in 1973. The last of his plays in which she performed on stage was Old Times (1971) as Anna. She played Lady Macbeth to Paul Scofield's Macbeth for the Royal Shakespeare Company in 1967, directed by Sir Peter Hall.

Merchant took the role of Madame in the Greenwich Theatre revival of Jean Genet's The Maids partnering Glenda Jackson and Susannah York: This was filmed in 1974 by Christopher Miles. In 1975, Merchant and Timothy Dalton headed the cast of a revival of Coward's The Vortex at the Greenwich Theatre.

Personal life
Merchant was the first wife of Harold Pinter, whom she met while working as a repertory actress; he was then working as an actor under the stage name of David Baron. They married in 1956, and their son, Daniel, was born in 1958.

Their marriage began disintegrating in the mid-1960s. From 1962 to 1969, Pinter had a clandestine affair with Joan Bakewell, which inspired his play Betrayal. In 1975, he began a serious affair with the historian Lady Antonia Fraser, the wife of Sir Hugh Fraser, which he confessed to his wife that March. At first, Merchant took it very well, saying positive things about Fraser, according to her friend artist Guy Vaesen (as cited by  Billington); but, Vaesen recalled, after "a female friend of Vivien's trotted round to her house and poisoned her mind against Antonia ... life in Hanover Terrace [where the Pinters then lived] gradually became impossible". Pinter left, and Merchant filed for divorce and gave interviews to the tabloid press, expressing her distress. Merchant made some unflattering comments about Fraser at this time: "He didn't need to take a change of shoes. He can always wear hers. She has very big feet, you know." Merchant believed Fraser to be the basis for the character of Emma in Pinter's play Betrayal, never learning about his prior affair with Joan Bakewell.

The Frasers' divorce became final in 1977, and the Pinters' in 1980. In 1980, Pinter and Fraser married.

Death
Merchant became deeply depressed after the end of her marriage to Pinter and turned to drinking. She died at the age of 53 on 3 October 1982, from alcoholism.

Filmography

Film

Television

Source:  (With corrections)

References

External links
 

1929 births
1982 deaths
Actresses from Manchester
Alcohol-related deaths in England
BAFTA Most Promising Newcomer to Leading Film Roles winners
Best Actress BAFTA Award (television) winners
English film actresses
English stage actresses
Booker authors' division
Harold Pinter
20th-century English actresses